Oliver-Sven Buder (born 23 June 1966 in Steinheidel-Erlabrunn, Bezirk Karl-Marx-Stadt) is a German track and field athlete, who in the 1990s belonged to the best shot-putters in the world.  The high point of his career came at the World Championships in 1997 and 1999 where he won the silver medal.  Until 1990 he represented East Germany.

Buder grew up in Niederlungwitz in Saxony.  He began as a child in track and field and as his talent emerged he was sent to the children and youth sport school in Karl-Marx-Stadt (later Chemnitz).

He represented the Karl-Marx-Stadt sport club (later Chemnitz sport club).  After the reunification of Germany he switched to TV Wattenscheid (trainer: Guenter Stolz, Miroslav Jasinski), in 2001 he went to the MTV Ingolstadt (trainer: Joachim Lipske).  While he was active he was 2.00 meters tall and weighed 125 kg.

In 1986 he began studying engineering, but after the fall of East Germany he stopped.  Later he began schooling to work in a bank but then changed to industrial buyer.  He is married. In 2003 he ended his career after having taken a long break due to injury.

International competitions

References

European Championships

External links

1966 births
Living people
People from Erzgebirgskreis
East German male shot putters
German male shot putters
Olympic athletes of Germany
Athletes (track and field) at the 1996 Summer Olympics
Athletes (track and field) at the 2000 Summer Olympics
World Athletics Championships athletes for Germany
World Athletics Championships medalists
European Athletics Championships medalists
Sportspeople from Saxony